Martine Moen (born 30 October 1992) is a retired Norwegian handball player, who last played for Fredrikstad BK.

In February 2015, she was selected in a squad for Norway's national recruit team in handball. After recovering from a serious injury Moen made a comeback for Halden HK late December 2015, and after improving her play and showing a great form, she was once again selected to represent Norways national recruit team in March 2016.

Achievements
Norwegian Cup:
Finalist: 2014

References

1992 births
Living people
People from Sarpsborg
Norwegian female handball players
Norwegian expatriate sportspeople in Denmark
Expatriate handball players
Sportspeople from Viken (county)